Gilbert P. Hamilton was an American film company executive and director. He worked at Essanay as a cinematographer, headed the St. Louis Motion Picture Company, and then launched the Albuquerque Motion Picture Company.

Jack L. Warner described him as a tall sunburned Englishman with walrus mustache and thick accent "like a Kipling character".

As a cinematographer, Hamilton collaborated with playwright and actor Lawrence Lee at Essanay in 1908. His move away from  St. Louis Motion Picture Company came after it acquired Frontier Pictures and relocated to Santa Paula, California. Dot Farley followed him to his new studio Albuquerque.

Filmography
Geronimo's Last Raid (1912)
Trapped in a Forest Fire (1913) starring Charlotte Burton
Soul Mates (1913)
In the Mountains of Virginia (1913)
Lieutenant Danny of the U.S.A. (1916)
The Maternal Spark (1917), starring Josie Sedgewick (stage name for female unpersonator Julian Eltinge)
Everywoman's Husband (1918)
High Tide (1918)
Captain of His Soul (1918), a Triangle Film Corporation production based on Eleanor Talbot Kinkead's magazine story "Shackles"
False Ambition (1918), Triangle Film
Judith (1918) starring Alma Rubens
 The Golden Fleece (1918)
Open Your Eyes (1919)
Coax Me (1919)	
The Woman of Lies (1919)
The Tiger Band	(1920)
A Soul in Trust starring Belle Bennett
Iron and Lavender starring Belle Bennett

References

American film directors
American cinematographers